Raymond James Tower is a 21-story skyscraper and is the second tallest building in Memphis, Tennessee. The building is located at the corner of North Front Street and Jefferson Avenue and South Main Street.

It is currently owned by Orlando, Florida based Parkway Properties, which has owned the building since 1997. The company once owned six other buildings in Memphis, but has since sold them off.  As of July 2008, the building was 100% occupied.

Structure
The building is clad in carmen red flame cut and polished granite, and is topped with a 61-foot spire, which is a distinctive feature of the Memphis skyline.

In a nod to the past, the four giant stone griffins — a mythological creature with the body of a lion and the wings and head of an eagle - that adorned the former Hotel King Cotton are displayed in the atrium of the Raymond James Tower.

History
The site was previously occupied by the Hotel King Cotton, a 12-story high-rise hotel built in 1927.  The building demolition was performed by Memphis Wrecking Company and Controlled Demolition, Inc. in April 1984.

The building was developed by Lowery Companies, LLC., and was designed by 3D/International of Houston.

It was home to Raymond James, formerly known as Morgan Keegan & Company. Raymond James was the anchor tenant. As of February 2021, Raymond James has moved to two East Memphis locations. Other tenants include KPMG, Dr. Kelli Dumas DDS, and several local law firms.

See also
List of tallest buildings in Memphis

References

External links
Emporis Listing of building

Skyscraper office buildings in Memphis, Tennessee
Office buildings completed in 1985
1985 establishments in Tennessee